is a private junior college in the city of Kyoto, Japan. The college opened in 1950, and is now attached to Ryukoku University.

Departments
 Social welfare studies
 Child care studies

External links
 

Japanese junior colleges
Universities and colleges in Kyoto
Educational institutions established in 1950
1950 establishments in Japan